Hershkowitz is a surname. Notable people with the surname include:

Allen Hershkowitz, American environmentalist
Arie Hershkowitz, Israeli academic
Daniel Hershkowitz (born 1953), Israeli politician, mathematician, rabbi, and president of Bar-Ilan University
Fishel Hershkowitz (born 1922–2017), American Hasidic rabbi
Kim Hirschovits, Finnish ice hockey player
Philip Herschkowitz (1906–1989), Romanian-born Russian composer and music theorist
Sara Hershkowitz, American soprano
Vic Hershkowitz (1918–2008), American handball player
Zeev Hershkowitz, Israeli footballer

Jewish surnames